Mieścisko  is a village in Wągrowiec County, Greater Poland Voivodeship, in west-central Poland. It is the seat of the gmina (administrative district) called Gmina Mieścisko.

References

Villages in Wągrowiec County